Yu Ai-Wen (born December 25, 1995) is a Taiwanese female sport shooter. At the 2012 Summer Olympics, she competed in the Women's 10 metre air pistol.

Yu Ai-wen won gold in FISU World Shooting Sport Championship 2018.

References

Taiwanese female sport shooters
Living people
Olympic shooters of Taiwan
Shooters at the 2012 Summer Olympics
Shooters at the 2016 Summer Olympics
Shooters at the 2010 Asian Games
1995 births
Shooters at the 2018 Asian Games
Asian Games competitors for Chinese Taipei
Universiade gold medalists for Chinese Taipei
Universiade medalists in shooting
Medalists at the 2019 Summer Universiade